The Betsileo short-tailed rat (Brachyuromys betsileoensis) is a species of rodent in the family Nesomyidae. It is found only in Madagascar. Its natural habitats are subtropical or tropical dry forests and subtropical or tropical dry shrubland.

References

Musser, G. G. and M. D. Carleton. 2005. Superfamily Muroidea. pp. 894–1531 in Mammal Species of the World a Taxonomic and Geographic Reference. D. E. Wilson and D. M. Reeder eds. Johns Hopkins University Press, Baltimore.

Betsileo short-tailed rat
Betsileo short-tailed rat
Taxonomy articles created by Polbot